The Glory Pier is a pier at the river mouth of Love River in Lingya District, Kaohsiung, Taiwan.

History
The pier was originally known as Pier 13 in which it used to serve as the military port that connected between Kaohsiung and Kinmen and Matsu. After its retirement as military port in 2005, the Kaohsiung City Government renamed the pier to be Glory Pier to commemorate its glorious history. The government also built a 500 meters-long path along the pier which turning it into a new scenic with the view of the bay.

Activities
There have been numerous cultural and art exhibitions and live performances held at the pier, such as the annual Kaohsiung Maritime Expo and Kaohsiung's New Year celebrations.

The pier features a bridge that connects to the other side of the Love River, as well as a fountain.

Transportation
The pier is accessible within walking distance west of Central Park Station of Kaohsiung MRT.

Around the pier (within 1 km)
Metro Stations
 Glory Pier light rail station
 Love Pier light rail station
 Cruise Terminal light rail station
Piers, Rivers, and Parks
 Love Pier
 Love River
 Shigang Riverside ParkArt Centers Kaohsiung Music Center
 Pier-2 Art CenterNight Markets and Shopping Centers Hanshin Department Store
 Lingya/Ziqiang Night MarketBridges'''
 Lingyaliao Iron Bridge

See also
 List of tourist attractions in Taiwan

References

Lingya District
Piers in Kaohsiung